Vinsobres is a commune in the Drôme department in the Auvergne-Rhône-Alpes region in southeastern France.

Geography
Vinsobres is located 9 km south-west of Nyons, 14 km north-east of Tulette, 12 km south-east of Valréas, and 15 km north of Vaison-la-Romaine.

The neighbouring communes are Mirabel-aux-Baronnies and Saint-Maurice-sur-Eygues.

History
Alphonse de Bounard was the Marquis of Archimbaud, Lord of Roquebrune, Vérone and Vinsobres, Baron of Montguers and royalist member of parliament for Nyons.

According to the tradition he was descended from the Cort Palatine and Italian painter, Arcimboldo.

Toponymy
The oldest form is de Vinzobrio, attested in 1137.  It is made up of the root, vintio-, which originates from the pre-Celtic vin-t (height), and from the Celtic suffix briga (mountain).

Population

Sights
 The ruins of a castle keep tower over the village, and the remains of the medieval enclosure and one gate, known as the "Portalou" can also be seen. 
 La Touche, Deurre and the Château of Véronne: are all fortified houses dating from the Modern Period.

Economy

Wine

Vinsobres is an appellation for red wine since 2006.

See also
Communes of the Drôme department

References

Communes of Drôme